Sthenias damarensis is a species of beetle in the family Cerambycidae. It was described by Adlbauer in 2011. It is known from Namibia.

References

Endemic fauna of Namibia
damarensis
Beetles described in 2011